The United Arab Emirates has an embassy in Hanoi, while Vietnam has an embassy in Abu Dhabi.

History

Although the two countries are for the most part culturally and religiously different, the Chams, an indigenous people in Central and Southern Vietnam share the same religion as Emiratis and had embraced Islam as for the result of the historical trades from the Arab traders as well as Malay traders, who brought Islam into the region.

Economic relations
Since the 1986 economic reform in Vietnam, the UAE has become one of the largest Arab and Islamic economic investors in Vietnam. The UAE is also a donor for several construction of mosques in Vietnam, including Vietnam's largest mosque was opened in January 2006 in Xuân Lộc, Đồng Nai Province; its construction was partially funded by donations from Saudi Arabia and the United Arab Emirates. The UAE also provides Islamic education to the Vietnamese Muslim community, notably the Chams.

References

External links
Embassy of the UAE in Hanoi, Vietnam
Embassy of Vietnam in Abu Dhabi, the UAE 

 
Vietnam
Bilateral relations of Vietnam